Larry Tabay Atkins III (born July 21, 1975 in Santa Monica, California) is a former American football linebacker. Atkins played in the National Football League from 1999 to 2003, having previously attended Venice High School and UCLA. He spent four years with the Kansas City Chiefs and one year with the Oakland Raiders. In his five-year career, Atkins recorded nine tackles, one forced fumble, and one fumble recovery.

References

External links
Database Football profile

1975 births
American football linebackers
Kansas City Chiefs players
Living people
Oakland Raiders players
Players of American football from Santa Monica, California
UCLA Bruins football players
Venice High School (Los Angeles) alumni